Bogoria matutina (previously known as Rhinerrhizopsis matutina), commonly known as the cupped freckle orchid, is an epiphytic orchid from the family Orchidaceae. It has thin, spreading roots, fibrous stems, between three and eight dark green, leathery leaves and up to fifty fragrant, short-lived, yellowish flowers with brown blotches and a white or yellowish labellum. It usually grows on rainforest trees and is found in tropical North Queensland, Australia.

Description
Flowering occurs from July to September.

Taxonomy and naming
The cupped freckle orchid was first formally described as Rhinerrhizopsis matutina in 2006 by David Jones and Mark Clements and the description was published in Australian Orchid Research. The specific epithet (matutina) is a Latin word meaning "of the morning" or "early", referring to the short-lived flowers. In 2019, Jones and Clements updated their description and classification, instead including the species in the genus Bogoria, recognized as heterotypic with Rhinerrhizopsis. The name Rhinerrhizopsis matutina is accepted at the Australian Plant Census.

Distribution and habitat
Bogoria matutina grows on rainforest trees, especially near forest edges, streams and roadsides. It is found in the Iron and McIlwraith Ranges in tropical North Queensland.

References

Aeridinae
Epiphytic orchids
Endemic orchids of Australia
Orchids of Queensland
Plants described in 2006
Taxa named by David L. Jones (botanist)
Taxa named by Mark Alwin Clements